Muhammad Natshir Fadhil Mahbuby (born 13 February 1993), simply known as Deden is an Indonesian professional footballer who plays as a goalkeeper for Liga 1 club Dewa United.

International career 
In 2015, he made his debut for the Indonesia U-23, starting in a 1–0 win against Malaysia U-23. He then was part of the team prepared for 2016 AFC U-23 Championship qualification and 2015 Southeast Asian Games, playing in two friendly matches. He played three times in the 2016 AFC U-23 Championship qualification. He played one time in the 2015 Southeast Asian Games.

Career statistics

Club

Honours

Club
Pelita Jaya U–21
 Indonesia Super League U-21: 2008–09

Persib Bandung
 Indonesia Super League: 2014
 Indonesia President's Cup: 2015

References

External links 
 

1993 births
Living people
People from Bandung
Sportspeople from West Java
Sportspeople from Bandung
Indonesian footballers
Pelita Jaya FC players
Arema F.C. players
Persib Bandung players
Dewa United F.C. players
Liga 1 (Indonesia) players
Association football goalkeepers
Indonesian Super League-winning players
Indonesia youth international footballers